Ashing is a test to deduce the amount of ash forming material present in a petroleum product so as to decide its use in certain applications. Ash-forming materials are considered to be undesirable impurities or contaminants.

The specimen is placed in a suitable vessel, evaporating dish or crucible and ignited. It is allowed to burn until only ash and carbon remains. The carbonaceous residue is reduced to ash by heating in a muffle furnace at about 775 °C, cooled and weighed.

Ashing is also performed prior to chemical analysis by inductively coupled plasma emission spectrometry. Another application is the detection of asbestos content in certain products.

See also
Ash (analytical chemistry)
Inductively coupled plasma emission spectrometry
Atomic absorption spectroscopy

Analytical chemistry